Graner may refer to:
Charles Graner - U.S. Army reservist involved in the Abu Ghraib prisoner abuse scandal.
Jim Graner - Cleveland sportscaster.
Cláudia Graner - female Brazilian water polo player.
Sheri Graner Ray - computer game designer.
Cellular Potts model (also known as the Glazier and Graner model) - a lattice-based computational modeling method to simulate the collective behavior of cellular structures.